A Shadow at the Window (Spanish: Una sombra en la ventana) is a 1944 Spanish crime film directed by Ignacio F. Iquino and starring Manuel Luna, Ana Mariscal and María Martín. It was based on a novel by Cecilio Benítez de Castro.

Cast
 Teresa Idel 
 Manuel Luna 
 Ana Mariscal 
 María Martín 
 Francisco Melgares 
 Adriano Rimoldi 
 Jesús Tordesillas

References

Bibliography
 Bentley, Bernard. A Companion to Spanish Cinema. Boydell & Brewer 2008.

External links 

1944 films
Spanish crime films
1944 crime films
1940s Spanish-language films
Films directed by Ignacio F. Iquino
Films with screenplays by Ignacio F. Iquino
Spanish black-and-white films
1940s Spanish films